John Lawrence Hathaway (born 1 July 1987) is an English  mixed martial artist who competes in the welterweight division.

Mixed martial arts career

Background and early career
Formerly an open-side flanker for local rugby team Hove RFC, Hathaway decided to make the transition to mixed martial arts after watching the Ultimate Fighting championship on television. He made his professional MMA debut on 25 June 2006, defeating his opponent via rear naked choke in the first round.

John Hathaway currently trains at London Shootfighters. Hathaway also trained in the US with American Top Team and 10th Planet Jiu Jitsu with Eddie Bravo.

Ultimate Fighting Championship

After signing a four fight deal, Hathaway was scheduled to fight undefeated Tom Egan at UFC 93. He made an impressive UFC debut, scoring a dominant first round TKO win over Egan via elbows.

Hathaway defeated the debuting Rick Story via unanimous decision at UFC 99.

Hathaway's next fight was against Paul Taylor at UFC 105. Hathaway won a unanimous decision (30-27, 30-27, 30-26).

Hathaway then faced the biggest fight of his career as he fought Diego Sanchez on 29 May 2010 at UFC 114, in Sanchez' return to welterweight. In the first round, Hathaway dropped Sanchez with a knee to the head, as Sanchez attempted a takedown. Hathaway then dominated with ground and pound. The rest of the fight saw Hathaway utilize his reach advantage to dominate the striking, which gave him the unanimous decision victory.

Hathaway was expected to face Dong Hyun Kim at UFC 120, but Kim was forced out of the bout with an injury and replaced by Mike Pyle. Hathaway lost to Pyle via unanimous decision after being overmatched by the heavy underdog. This loss was also the first of his career.

Hathaway fought Kris McCray on 26 March 2011 at UFC Fight Night 24. The fight was closely contested throughout. However, Hathaway walked away the winner via split decision.

Hathaway was expected to face Pascal Krauss on 5 November 2011 at UFC 138.  However, on 30 August Krauss pulled out of the bout citing a shoulder injury, and was replaced by Matt Brown.  On 17 October, Hathaway himself was forced to pull out of the bout due to an undisclosed injury.  As a result, Brown was pulled from the card and shifted to UFC 139.

Hathaway/Krauss took place on 5 May 2012 at UFC on Fox 3. He won the fight via unanimous decision.

Hathaway beat John Maguire via unanimous decision on 29 September 2012 at UFC on Fuel TV 5.

Hathaway was expected to face Erick Silva on 8 June 2013 at UFC on Fuel TV 10.  However, Hathaway was pulled from the bout in late April and replaced by Jason High.

Hathaway returned from his extended hiatus to face Dong Hyun Kim on 1 March 2014 at The Ultimate Fighter: China Finale.  He lost the fight via third round knockout due to a spinning back elbow.

Hathaway was expected to face Gunnar Nelson on 11 July 2015 at UFC 189.  However, Hathaway pulled out of the bout on 23 June citing injury, and was replaced by Brandon Thatch.

Return from retirement 
After almost 8 years after his last bout, Hathaway made his return on October 15, 2022 at Oktagon 36 against André Ricardo. He won his return, dominating the bout on the way to a unanimous decision victory.

Personal life
Hathaway was diagnosed with Crohn's disease in 2010. This prevented him from fighting from 2014–2022.

Championships and achievements
Freestyle Wrestling
 British National Freestyle wrestling Runner up (Two times)
 NEWA freestyle wrestling champion (One time)

Mixed martial arts record

|-
| Win
| align=center| 18–2
| André Ricardo
| Decision (unanimous)
| Oktagon 36
| 
| align=center| 3
| align=center| 5:00
| Frankfurt, Germany
|
|-
| Loss
| align=center| 17–2
| Dong Hyun Kim
| KO (spinning elbow)
| The Ultimate Fighter China Finale: Kim vs. Hathaway
| 
| align=center| 3
| align=center| 1:02
| Macau, SAR, China
| 
|-
| Win
| align=center| 17–1
| John Maguire
| Decision (unanimous)
| UFC on Fuel TV: Struve vs. Miocic
| 
| align=center| 3
| align=center| 5:00
| Nottingham, England
| 
|-
| Win
| align=center| 16–1
| Pascal Krauss
| Decision (unanimous)
| UFC on Fox: Diaz vs. Miller
| 
| align=center| 3
| align=center| 5:00
| East Rutherford, New Jersey, United States
| 
|-
| Win
| align=center| 15–1
| Kris McCray
| Decision (split)
| UFC Fight Night: Nogueira vs. Davis
| 
| align=center| 3
| align=center| 5:00
| Seattle, Washington, United States
| 
|-
| Loss
| align=center| 14–1
| Mike Pyle
| Decision (unanimous)
| UFC 120
| 
| align=center| 3
| align=center| 5:00
| London, England
| 
|-
| Win
| align=center| 14–0
| Diego Sanchez
| Decision (unanimous)
| UFC 114
| 
| align=center| 3
| align=center| 5:00
| Las Vegas, Nevada, United States
| 
|-
| Win
| align=center| 13–0
| Paul Taylor
| Decision (unanimous)
| UFC 105
| 
| align=center| 3
| align=center| 5:00
| Manchester, England
| 
|-
| Win
| align=center| 12–0
| Rick Story
| Decision (unanimous)
| UFC 99
| 
| align=center| 3
| align=center| 5:00
| Cologne, Germany
| 
|-
| Win
| align=center| 11–0
| Tom Egan
| TKO (elbows)
| UFC 93
| 
| align=center| 1
| align=center| 4:36
| Dublin, Ireland
| 
|-
| Win
| align=center| 10–0
| Jack Mason
| Submission (punches)
| Cage Rage 28
| 
| align=center| 1
| align=center| 2:41
| London, England
| 
|-
| Win
| align=center| 9–0
| Richard Griffin
| TKO (punches)
| ZT Fight Night 12
| 
| align=center| 1
| align=center| 2:41
| Brighton, England
| 
|-
| Win
| align=center| 8–0
| Marvin Arnold Bleau
| TKO (punches)
| Cage Rage 25
| 
| align=center| 1
| align=center| 1:32
| London, England
| 
|-
| Win
| align=center| 7–0
| Tommy Maguire
| TKO (punches)
| Cage Rage Contenders 7
| 
| align=center| 2
| align=center| 3:17
| London, England
| 
|-
| Win
| align=center| 6–0
| Charles Barbosa
| Decision (unanimous)
| Cage Rage Contenders 6
| 
| align=center| 3
| align=center| 5:00
| London, England
| 
|-
| Win
| align=center| 5–0
| Tarcio Santana
| Decision (unanimous)
| Cage Rage Contenders 5
| 
| align=center| 3
| align=center| 5:00
| London, England
| 
|-
| Win
| align=center| 4–0
| Sergei Ussanov
| Submission (rear-naked choke)
| Cage Rage Contenders 4
| 
| align=center| 1
| align=center| 2:08
| London, England
| 
|-
| Win
| align=center| 3–0
| Ludovic Perez
| Submission (punches)
| ZT Fight Night 4
| 
| align=center| 1
| align=center| N/A
| London, England
| 
|-
| Win
| align=center| 2–0
| Wesley Felix
| TKO (punches)
| Full Contact Fight Night 3
| 
| align=center| 2
| align=center| 1:33
| Bracknell, England
| 
|-
| Win
| align=center| 1–0
| Jim Morris
| Submission (rear-naked choke)
| ZT Fight Night 2
| 
| align=center| 1
| align=center| N/A
| Sussex, England
|

See also
 List of current UFC fighters
 List of male mixed martial artists

References

External links

John Hathaway Personal Site
Official UFC Profile

1987 births
Living people
Sportspeople from Brighton
English male mixed martial artists
Welterweight mixed martial artists
Mixed martial artists utilizing freestyle wrestling
Mixed martial artists utilizing Brazilian jiu-jitsu
English practitioners of Brazilian jiu-jitsu
British male sport wrestlers
Ultimate Fighting Championship male fighters